Rashid Shaz is an Indian Islamic scholar at the Aligarh Muslim University, India. His books include: Idrak Zawal-e-Ummat, lastam pokh, kitabul Urooj, and Manifesto of United Islam.

Brief introduction
Rashid Shaz is an ISESCO Ambassador for Dialogue of Culture among Civilizations  and a professor of English at the Aligarh Muslim University, India. In 2008, he released in Monaco an important founding document “Calling for a New Dialogue between Islam and Christianity”. Shaz has also engaged with the debate on shibh-ahle-kitab. In his book ادراک اسباب تراجع الامۃ(۲ مجلد) he takes up the issue from the point where Al-Baironi and Shahrastani had left. In 2004, he motivated many enlightened intellectuals in Abrahamic traditions to debate the common issues on futureislam.com.

Appreciation and activism
In 1992, while the Oslo Peace Accord was in the air, he went on a peace mission to London and Washington DC to convey to the policy makers in these capitals about the Muslim sentiments on Jerusalem. In 1994, he launched from New Delhi a weekly newspaper Milli Times International that ceased publishing in the year 2001.

In news
Professor Rashid Shaz condemned the silence of Aligarh on lynching incidents.

References

External links
Future Islam 
Bridge Course 
www.rashidshaz.com
Madrasa Sirajul Uloom Hilali Sarai Sambhal

1963 births
Living people
Academic staff of Aligarh Muslim University
Indian activists
Indian male writers
21st-century Muslim scholars of Islam